The Shiba-Baranai-Gurnai River is located in western Bangladesh. It begins as the Shiba in Tanore Upazila.

References

Rivers of Bangladesh
Rivers of Rajshahi Division